Henry Roger Tempest  (2 April 1924 – 6 May 2017) was an English landowner of the Tempest family and the owner of Broughton Hall. He was married to Catholic philanthropist Janet Tempest and was the father of the artist Annie Tempest.

References

External links 
Tempest family, of Bolton, Lancashire

1924 births
2017 deaths
English landowners
Alumni of Christ Church, Oxford
Deputy Lieutenants of North Yorkshire
People educated at The Oratory School
People from Craven District
Scots Guards officers
Deaths from kidney failure
Henry